, translated from Japanese as "staff technique", is the martial art of stick fighting using a bō, which is the Japanese word for staff. Staffs have been in use for thousands of years in Asian martial arts like Silambam. Some techniques involve slashing, swinging, and stabbing with the staff. Others involve using the staff as a vaulting pole or as a prop for hand-to-hand strikes.

Today bōjutsu is usually associated either with Okinawan kobudō
or with Japanese koryū budō. Japanese bōjutsu is one of the core elements of classical martial training.

Thrusting, swinging, and striking techniques often resemble empty-hand movements, following the philosophy that the bō is merely an "extension of one’s limbs". Consequently, bōjutsu is often incorporated into other styles of empty-hand fighting, like traditional Jū-jutsu, and karate.

In the Okinawan context, the weapon is frequently referred to as the kon (棍).

See also

Angampora
Banshay
Bataireacht
Gatka
Jūkendō
Kalaripayattu
Kendo
Kenjutsu
Krabi–krabong
Kuttu Varisai
Mardani khel
Silambam
Silambam Asia
Tahtib
Thang-ta
Varma kalai
World Silambam Association
Bando
Lethwei
Naban
Kbachkun boraan
Jō
Jōjutsu
Hanbō
Tanbō
Kanabō
Three-section staff
Quarterstaff
Yamanni-ryū

References 

Stick-fighting
Japanese martial arts
Ko-ryū bujutsu
Ninjutsu skills